This is a list of the described species of the Solifugae family Ammotrechidae. The data is taken from Joel Hallan's Biology Catalog.

Ammotrechinae
Ammotrechinae Roewer, 1934

 Ammotrecha Banks, 1900
 Ammotrecha araucana Mello Leitao, 1942 — Chile
 Ammotrecha chiapasi Muma, 1986 — Mexico
 Ammotrecha cobinensis Muma, 1951 — USA, Mexico
 Ammotrecha friedlaenderi Roewer, 1954 — Brazil
 Ammotrecha itzaana Muma, 1986 — Mexico
 Ammotrecha limbata (Lucas, 1835) — Central America
 Ammotrecha nigrescens Roewer, 1934 — Central America
 Ammotrecha picta Pocock, 1902 — Guatemala
 Ammotrecha stollii (Pocock, 1895) — Central America, USA

 Ammotrechella Roewer, 1934
 Ammotrechella apejii Muma, 1971 — Jamaica
 Ammotrechella bahamica Muma, 1986 — Bahamas
 Ammotrechella bolivari Mello Leitao, 1942 — Mexico
 Ammotrechella bonariensis (Werner, 1925) — Bonaire
 Ammotrechella diaspora Roewer, 1934 — Cape Verde
 Ammotrechella geniculata (C. L. Koch, 1842) — West Indies, northern South America
 Ammotrechella hispaniolana Armas & Alegre, 2001 — Dominican Republic
 Ammotrechella maguirei Muma, 1986 — Turks Caicos
 Ammotrechella pallida Muma & Nezario, 1971 — Puerto Rico
 Ammotrechella pseustes (Chamberlin, 1925) — Panama, California, Puerto Rico
 Ammotrechella setulosa Muma, 1951 — Texas
 Ammotrechella stimpsoni (Putnam, 1883) — Mexico, Florida
 Ammotrechella tabogana Chamberlin, 1919 — Panama

 Ammotrechesta Roewer, 1934
 Ammotrechesta brunnea Roewer, 1934 — Costa Rica
 Ammotrechesta garcetei Armas, 1993 — Nicaragua
 Ammotrechesta maesi Armas, 1993 — Nicaragua
 Ammotrechesta schlueteri Roewer, 1934 — Honduras
 Ammotrechesta tuzi Armas, 2000 — Mexico

 Ammotrechinus Roewer, 1934
 Ammotrechinus gryllipes (Gervais, 1842) — Haiti, Jamaica

 Ammotrechona Roewer, 1934
 Ammotrechona cubae (Lucas, 1835) — Cuba

 Ammotrechula Roewer, 1934
 Ammotrechula boneti Mello Leitao, 1942 — Mexico
 Ammotrechula borregoensis Muma, 1962 — Mexico, USA
 Ammotrechula catalinae Muma, 1989 — Arizona
 Ammotrechula gervaisii (Pocock, 1895) — Colombia, Ecuador
 Ammotrechula lacuna Muma, 1963 — Nevada
 Ammotrechula mulaiki Muma, 1951 — Texas
 Ammotrechula peninsulanus (Banks, 1898)
 Ammotrechula pilosa Muma, 1951 — USA
 Ammotrechula saltatrix (Simon, 1879) — Mexico
 Ammotrechula schusterae Roewer, 1954 — Nicaragua, El Salvador
 Ammotrechula venusta Muma, 1951 — Mexico, Arizona
 Ammotrechula wasbaueri Muma, 1962 — California

 Antillotrecha Armas, 1994
 Antillotrecha fraterna Armas, 1994 — Dominican Republic
 Antillotrecha iviei Armas, 2002 — Leeward Islands

 Campostrecha Mello Leitao, 1937
 Campostrecha felisdens Mello Leitao, 1937 — Ecuador

 Dasycleobis Mello Leitao, 1940
 Dasycleobis crinitus Mello Leitao, 1940 — Argentina

 Neocleobis Roewer, 1934
 Neocleobis solitarius (Banks, 1902) — Galapagos

 Pseudocleobis Pocock, 1900
 Pseudocleobis alticola Pocock, 1900 —  South America
 Pseudocleobis andinus (Pocock, 1899) —  South America
 Pseudocleobis arequipae Roewer, 1959 — Peru
 Pseudocleobis bardensis Maury, 1976 — Argentina
 Pseudocleobis calchaqui Maury, 1983 — Argentina
 Pseudocleobis chilensis Roewer, 1934 — Chile
 Pseudocleobis hirschmanni Kraepelin, 1911 — Bolivia, Chile
 Pseudocleobis huinca Maury, 1976 — Argentina
 Pseudocleobis ilavea Roewer, 1952 — Peru
 Pseudocleobis levii Maury, 1980 — Argentina
 Pseudocleobis morsicans (Gervais, 1849) —  South America
 Pseudocleobis mustersi Maury, 1980 — Argentina
 Pseudocleobis orientalis Maury, 1976 — Argentina
 Pseudocleobis ovicornis Lawrence, 1954 — Peru
 Pseudocleobis peruviana Roewer, 1957 — Peru
 Pseudocleobis puelche Maury, 1976 — Argentina
 Pseudocleobis solitarius Maury, 1976 — Argentina
 Pseudocleobis tarmana Roewer, 1952 — Peru
 Pseudocleobis titschacki (Roewer, 1942) — Peru
 Pseudocleobis truncatus Maury, 1976 — Argentina

Mortolinae
Mortolinae Mello-Leitão, 1938

 Mortola Mello Leitao, 1938
 Mortola mortola Mello Leitao, 1938 — Argentina

Nothopuginae
Nothopuginae Maury, 1976

 Nothopuga Maury, 1976
 Nothopuga cuyana Maury, 1976 — Argentina
 Nothopuga lobera Maury, 1976 — Argentina

Oltacolinae
Oltacolinae Rower, 1934

 Oltacola Roewer, 1934
 Oltacola chacoensis Roewer, 1934 — Argentina
 Oltacola goetschi Lawatsch, in Goetsch & Lawatsch 1944 — Argentina
 Oltacola gomezi Roewer, 1934 — Argentina
 Oltacola mendocina Mello Leitao, 1938 — Argentina

Saronominae
Saronominae Roewer, 1954

 Branchia Muma, 1951
 Branchia angustus Muma, 1951 — Mexico, USA
 Branchia brevis Muma, 1951 — Texas
 Branchia potens Muma, 1951 — Mexico, USA

 Chinchippus Chamberlin, 1920
 Chinchippus peruvianus Chamberlin, 1920 — Peru

 Innesa Roewer, 1934
 Innesa vittata (Pocock, 1902) — Guatemala

 Procleobis Kraepelin, 1899
 Procleobis patagonicus (Holmberg, 1876) — Argentina

 Saronomus Kraepelin, 1900
 Saronomus capensis (Kraepelin, 1899) — Colombia, Venezuela

incertae sedis

 Chileotrecha Maury, 1987
 Chileotrecha atacamensis Maury, 1987 — Chile

 Eutrecha Maury, 1982
 Eutrecha longirostris Maury, 1982 — Venezuela

 † Happlodontus Poinar & Santiago-Blay, 1989
 Happlodontus proterus Poinar & Samtiago Blay, 1989 — Fossil: miocene amber

 Xenotrecha Maury, 1982
 Xenotrecha huebneri (Kraepelin, 1899) — Venezuela

References
 Joel Hallan's Biology Catalog: Ammotrechidae

Ammotrechidae species
Ammotrechidae